Dollie Lowther Robinson (died August 4, 1983) was an American politician and labor rights worker, best known for her work with labor unions.

Early life and education 
An Elizabeth City N.C. native, Dollie Lowther Robinson was educated at Brooklyn College. She went on to receive a LL.B. degree from New York Law School. Robinson also received labor scholarships to the Hudson Shore Labor School and the Wellesley Institute for Social Progress.

Career and impact 
Robinson worked for labor rights in a variety of capacities. She served as a social investigator for New York City. She was associated with multiple organizations including the American Federation of Labor and Congress of Industrial Organizations (AFL-CIO). In 1955, she was appointed Secretary of the New York State Department of Labor. In 1961, she was appointed as Special Assistant to the Director of the Women's Bureau of the Department of Labor under the Kennedy Administration. Robinson left this position in 1963 to serve as special assistant to the president of the Hotel and Allied Service Union, Peter Ottley. Robinson was also involved in the political arena. In 1968, she ran for a seat in the United States House of Representatives against New York State Assemblyman Shirley Chisholm and New York State Senator William C. Thompson.

References 

Created via preloaddraft
African-American trade unionists
AFL–CIO people
American women trade unionists
1983 deaths
United States Department of Labor officials
New York Law School alumni
Brooklyn College alumni
20th-century African-American women